Little Voice or The Little Voice may refer to:

Books
The Little Voice, novel by Joss Sheldon 2016
The Little Voice, story by Ramsey Campbell in the anthology Shadows
The Little Voice, school paper of Colegio del Sagrado Corazon de Jesus

Theatre and film
The Rise and Fall of Little Voice, a 1992 play by Jim Cartwright
Little Voice (film), a 1998 UK film starring Jane Horrocks, based on the 1992 play
Little Voices (film), a 2011 Welsh student film on a separate storyline

Music
Little Voice, performer of the closing theme for the Japanese anime series Gear Fighter Dendoh
Little Voice (album), a 2007 album by Sara Bareilles
"Little Voice", a 2006 song by Vixen from the album Live & Learn
"The Little Voice", a 2000 song by Sahlene and covered by Hilary Duff

Other
Little Voice (TV series), a 2020 romantic comedy television series

See also
Internal monologue